Ciuciuieni is a commune in Sîngerei District, Moldova. It is composed of two villages, Brejeni and Ciuciuieni.

References

Communes of Sîngerei District